Mourad Lemsen(born 1 February 1980), is a Moroccan footballer. He usually plays as defender.

Career
Lemsen plays football for Wydad Casablanca. He helped the club reach the 2011 CAF Champions League Final, but was sent off in the return leg as Espérance Sportive de Tunis won the title.

References

1980 births
Living people
Moroccan footballers
Wydad AC players
Association football defenders